Nemea betousalis is a species of moth of the family Thyrididae. It is found in Kenya.

The wingspan of this species is 21–25 mm.

References

Endemic moths of Kenya
Thyrididae
Moths described in 1917
Moths of Africa